Rescue – The British Archaeological Trust is a charitable organisation in the United Kingdom. It was founded in 1971 as a pressure group by a team including the archaeologists Margaret Ursula Jones and Phillip A. Barker.

The Trust campaigns for government funds to permit the excavation of archaeological sites in advance of road-building, construction or other development. Specific actions include opposing the planned tunnel near the site of Stonehenge, proposed in 2017, claiming that it could threaten the site's UNESCO heritage status, and criticising the use of metal detectors to discover items of cultural significance.

References
Hunter, J. R. and Ralston, I. B. M. (eds), 1993, Archaeological Resource Management in the UK. Stroud: Alan Sutton.

External links
Official website

Archaeological organizations
Archaeology of the United Kingdom
1971 establishments in the United Kingdom
Organizations established in 1971